Prognatholiparis ptychomandibularis, the wrinkle-jaw snailfish, is a species of snailfish native to the northeastern Pacific Ocean from near Seguam Island in the Aleutian Islands. This species grows to a length of  SL. This species is the only known member of its genus.

References

Liparidae
Monotypic fish genera
Fish described in 2001